Karin Beate "Linn" Ullmann (born 9 August 1966) is a Norwegian author and journalist. A prominent literary critic, she also writes a column for Norway's leading morning newspaper and has published six novels.

Early life
Ullmann was born in Oslo, Norway to Norwegian actress, author and director Liv Ullmann and Swedish director and screenwriter Ingmar Bergman. She grew up in New York City and Oslo.

Ullmann attended Professional Children's School in Manhattan. When she was fifteen, she was "kicked out" (as she puts it) of the Norwegian National Opera and Ballet. She attended Juilliard School as a prospective dancer and graduated from New York University, where she studied English literature and began work on her PhD.

Career
When her first and critically acclaimed novel Before You Sleep was published in 1998, she was already known as an influential literary critic. Her second novel, Stella Descending was published in 2001 and her third novel Grace was published in 2002. For Grace, Ullmann received the literary award The Readers' Prize in Norway, and Grace was named one of the top ten novels that year by the prestigious newspaper Weekendavisen in Denmark. In 2007, Grace was longlisted for the Independent Foreign Fiction Prize in the United Kingdom, and in March the same year, the Norwegian theater Riksteatret played a successful run of the theatrical play Grace, based on the novel.

Ullmann's fourth novel A Blessed Child was published in Norway the fall of 2005, and it was shortlisted for the prestigious Norwegian literature prize – the Brage Prize. In 2007, she was awarded the Amalie Skram Award for her literary work, and she received Gullpennen (the Golden Pen) for her journalism in Norway's leading morning newspaper Aftenposten. In 2008, A Blessed Child was named Best Translated novel in the British newspaper The Independent, and in 2009 the novel was longlisted for the Independent Foreign Fiction Prize in the UK and the International IMPAC Dublin Literary Award in Ireland. Ullmann's novels are published throughout Europe and the United States and are translated into 30 languages.

Ullmann is co-founder (2009) and former artistic director of the international artist residency foundation The Bergman Estate on Fårö.

She served on the jury for the main competition at the 2011 Cannes Film Festival.

Ullmann's fifth novel, The Cold Song, was published in Norway on 24 November 2011.

In 2015, Ullmann appeared as a featured author, leading a writing seminar, at the annual Iceland Writers Retreat in Reykjavik, Iceland.

Personal life 
Ullmann is married to Niels Fredrik Dahl, a novelist, playwright and poet. They live in Oslo with their son.

Literary works
Before You Sleep (Før du sovner) 1998
Stella Descending (Når jeg er hos deg) 2001
Grace (Nåde) 2002
A Blessed Child (Et Velsignet Barn) 2005
The Cold Song (Det dyrebare) 2011
Unquiet (De urolige) 2019
Girl, 1983 (Jente, 1983) 2021

Literary awards
 Gold Pen  (2007)
 Amalie Skram Prize  (2007)
 Norwegian Readers' Prize  (2002)

References

External links
 Linn Ullmann's website
 Linn Ullmann  at :no:Oktober forlag
 Linn Ullmann  at NRK Forfatter
 Linn Ullmann  at Dagbladet Forfatter

1966 births
Living people
New York University alumni
Norwegian journalists
Norwegian women journalists
Norwegian people of Swedish descent
Norwegian people of Belgian descent
Writers from Oslo
Waldorf school alumni
Norwegian women novelists
20th-century Norwegian novelists
21st-century Norwegian novelists
20th-century Norwegian women writers
21st-century Norwegian women writers
Writers from New York City
Norwegian expatriates in the United States
Juilliard School alumni
Norwegian literary critics
Women literary critics
Norwegian women critics
Norwegian women non-fiction writers